Andrew Matthews may refer to:

 Andrew Matthews (bobsleigh) (born 1988), British bobsledder
 Andrew Matthews (entomologist) (1815–1897), British clergyman and entomologist
 Andrew Matthews (author) (born 1957), Australian author
 Andrew Edward Bertie Matthews (died 1995), medical student who volunteered to assist at Bergen-Belsen concentration camp
 Andy Matthews, American politician in the Nevada Assembly

See also
 Andrew Mathews (Royal Navy officer) (born 1958), Royal Navy officer
 Andrew Mathews (politician), American politician in the Minnesota Senate